Farandula Records is a Canadian music company founded in 2012 that is predominantly described as a Latin music company, but works with a variety of other genres, including pop music.

Farandula Records has established itself in the market as the leading independent Latin music company in Canada, supporting and promoting its artists, achieving imminent success in the Latin American market as a result.

History 
Founded by Yatxan Labrada in 2012, the vision of Farandula Records was to promote the musical career of Latino artists who live mainly in Canada, from the process of distributing the musical product to the marketing and music consulting part.

Farandula Records offers a full range of services for all music genres, including record label services, distribution, copyright administration, related rights management, royalty collection, marketing, promotion, and music consulting.

Over the past decade, Farandula Records has established itself as Canada's leading independent Latin music company, helping to diversify the Canadian Latin music landscape.

In 2022, the positioning and promotion method for new artists was through the song "Mas Reggaeton", a single organized by the label to merge talents from Latin America, represented by Sandy el White, Henry Méndez, El Cata, Ariel de Cuba, Fedro, Eduardo Antonio and Eri White, who reached more than 1 million views on YouTube.

Artists 
 Eduardo Antonio
 Aiona Santana
 El Cata 
 Henry Méndez
 Ariel de Cuba
 Fedro
 Dunia Ojeda
 Edwin Rivera
 Yulien Oviedo
 Ruly Rodriguez
 Ellys Leon
 Nersy Labrada 
 Genesis Diaz
 Sandy el White
 Duke Anthony
 Big Habana
 Peter La Anguila
 Aless Gibaja
 Flores Del Sol
 Pierre La Voz

Releases

Albums 
 2011: "Roy Treviño" - Roy Treviño
 2015: "Desde Mi Alma" - Eduardo Antonio
 2016: "Welcome to Metropolis" - Yulien Oviedo

Singles 
 2015: "Mete y Sácala" - EbonyVoice featuring Sito Diaz 
 2022: "Mentiras" - Eduardo Antonio featuring Lenier 
 2022: "Mas Reggaeton" - Sandy el White, Henry Méndez, El Cata, Ariel de Cuba, Fedro, Eduardo Antonio and Eri White
 2022: "Fronteo" - Aiona Santana

References 

Record label distributors
Entertainment companies established in 2012
Companies based in Ontario
Music companies of Canada
Latin music record labels